Clacket Lane services is a motorway service station on the M25 motorway midway between junctions 5 and 6, in Surrey, United Kingdom, adjacent to the parish borders between Limpsfield, Surrey and Westerham, Kent, a small village and a town respectively.

It is the largest Roadchef services in the UK, and one of the largest and busiest on the UK motorway network serving traffic on the extremely busy southern stretch of the M25 London orbital motorway, and traffic to and from the coastal ports and the Channel Tunnel. It is named after a road which passes over the motorway nearby.

History
Service stations at the site were first proposed in 1972. During planning, the services were intended to be named Titsey Wood after the forest that surrounds the site. The services were opened by Robert Key, Minister for Roads and Traffic on 21 July 1993.

During construction of the sites, artifacts from Roman Britain were found, specifically from a disused Roman road and are now displayed at the service station.

References

External links 
Motorway Services Online - Clacket Lane
The Motorway Services Trivia Site: Clacket Lane Services
Archaeological site report

M25 motorway service stations
RoadChef motorway service stations